Cataphractus may refer to:
 Cataphractus Gronow, 1763 – synonym of Pegasus
 Cataphractus Catesby, 1771 – not available
 Cataphractus Edwards, 1771 – synonym of Acanthodoras
 Cataphractus Klein, 1777 – synonym of Agonus
 Cataphractus Storr, 1780 – synonym of Dasypus
 Cataphractus Walbaum, 1792 – synonym of Agonus
 Cataphractus Bloch, 1794 – synonym of Callichthys
 Cataphractus Fleming, 1828 – synonym of Agonus

References 

 W. N. Eschmeyer: Catalog of Fishes electronic version (15 Oct 2013). California Academy of Sciences.